Sanel Kapidžić (born 14 April 1990) is a Danish professional footballer who plays as a forward.

Career
Born in Bosnia and Herzegovina, Kapidžić has lived in Denmark since 1992. He has always looked up to Zlatan Ibrahimović and hoped he can become like him one day. In an interview to Bosnian media, he said he would prefer to play for the Bosnia national team one day, but playing for the Denmark national team was also a choice.

On 24 August 2012, he moved to FC Fyn.

On 18 July 2018, Kapidžić signed for Sandnes Ulf.

Career statistics

References

External links

Official Danish Superliga statistics

1990 births
Living people
Footballers from Sarajevo
Danish people of Bosnia and Herzegovina descent
Yugoslav Wars refugees
Association football forwards
Bosnia and Herzegovina footballers
Aarhus Gymnastikforening players
FC Fredericia players
FC Fyn players
SK Vard Haugesund players
Mjøndalen IF players
Fredrikstad FK players
Korona Kielce players
Sandnes Ulf players
Danish Superliga players
Norwegian First Division players
Eliteserien players
Ekstraklasa players
Bosnia and Herzegovina expatriate footballers
Expatriate men's footballers in Denmark
Bosnia and Herzegovina expatriate sportspeople in Denmark
Expatriate footballers in Norway
Bosnia and Herzegovina expatriate sportspeople in Norway
Expatriate footballers in Poland
Bosnia and Herzegovina expatriate sportspeople in Poland